Shake, Rattle and Rock! is a 1956 musical and comedy-drama film directed by Edward L. Cahn for American International Pictures. It was originally released as a double feature with Runaway Daughters.

Plot
A disc jockey and a hipster battle adults trying to ban rock and roll in a small town.

Cast
Mike Connors (credited as "Touch Connors") as Garry Nelson
Lisa Gaye as June Fitzdingle
Sterling Holloway as Albert "Axe" McAllister
Douglass Dumbrille as Eustace Fentwick III
Raymond Hatton as Horace Fitzdingle
Margaret Dumont as Georgianna Fitzdingle
Percy Helton as Hiram, the funeral director
Paul Dubov as Bugsy Smith
Eddie Kafafian as Nick
Charles Evans as Bill Bentley
Clarence Kolb as Judge McCombs
Fats Domino as himself
Tommy Charles as himself
Jimmy Pickford as Eddie
Leon Tyler as Aloysius Pentigrouch
Pat Gregory as Pat
 Rosie and Carlos as teen dance contest winners
Annitta Ray as Annita, singing slum teen
Giovanna Fiorino as Helen
Frank Jenks as Frank, TV program manager
Joe Devlin as squad car officer
Pierre Watkin as Armstrong, editor
Nancy Kilgas as Nancy
Choker Campbell as himself
Big Joe Turner as himself

Production
Filming for Shake, Rattle and Rock! began on July 23, 1956. It was the first in a series of films for Sunset Productions, distributed by AIP.

Soundtrack
Fats Domino – "I'm in Love Again" (written by Domino as Antoine Domino)
Fats Domino – "Honey Chile"
Fats Domino – "Ain't That a Shame" (written by Domino and David Bartholomew)
Joe Turner – "Feelin' Happy"
Big Joe Turner – "Lipstick, Powder & Paint" (written by Charles F. Calhoun)
"The Choker"
"Rock, Rock, Rock"
"Sweet Love on My Mind" (written by Wayne Walker)
"Rockin' on Saturday Night" (written by George Matola and Johnny Lehmann)

Reception
In a modern-day review, Allmovie called the film "endearingly awful" and awarded it film a rating of two stars.

See also
List of American films of 1957

References

External links

1956 films
American black-and-white films
1950s English-language films
American teen comedy-drama films
1950s musical comedy-drama films
Films directed by Edward L. Cahn
American International Pictures films
American musical comedy-drama films
1950s American films